Celle di Bulgheria, also shortened as Celle Bulgheria, is a town and comune in the province of Salerno in the Campania region of south-western Italy.

History
The town was named after the Bulgars settled here with their leader Altsek (whose father was the second ever leader of the first bulgarian country) in the early Middle Ages.

Geography
Celle Bulgheria is located in Southern Cilento, near the mount Bulgheria, and is part of the Cilento and Vallo di Diano National Park. It borders with the municipalities of Camerota, Centola, Laurito, Montano Antilia and Roccagloriosa. Its hamlet (frazione) is the nearby village of Poderia.

Main sights
De Luca Palace
Madonna della Neve (Our Lady of the Snow) church 
Saint Sophia church, in Poderia
Mount Bulgheria

Transport
Celle di Bulgheria counts a railway station, Celle Bulgheria-Roccagloriosa, on the Naples-Salerno-Reggio Calabria railway line.

Crossed by the "Cilentana" highway Salerno-Sapri to the south, has the nearest exits at Poderia (west) and Roccagloriosa (east).

People
Antonio Maria De Luca (1764–1828), priest and patriot
Salvatore Venuta (1944–2007), biologist and oncologist

Twin towns
 Veliki Preslav, Bulgaria
 Bolgar, Russia

See also
Cilentan dialect
San Severino (Centola)

References

External links

 Official website 
 Tourist info about Celle 

Cities and towns in Campania
Localities of Cilento